This is a list of railway stations in the Christchurch region of New Zealand. It includes both those still in service and those that have been closed.  Included are stations on the following lines: Eyreton Branch, Little River Branch, Main North Line out to Rangiora, Main South Line out to Burnham, Midland Line out to Springfield, Oxford Branch, Southbridge Branch, Whitecliffs Branch.

List

Stations

Addington 
Until the 1970s, Addington was a major facility for the receiving and sale of livestock, with significant stock yards, races and loading platforms beside the track.  It handled livestock traffic from as far afield as Marlborough, South Canterbury and the West Coast, with the proceeds of the sales destined for locations all over the South Island.  Given the limited size of the lorry transport available at the time, it is understandable how the railways could compete with road transport for this type of traffic, even for relatively short distances.

One particularly sought-after source of livestock for Addington was the sheep of the Molesworth cattle and sheep station in Marlborough.  From 1957 until about 1970, this livestock was driven to the railhead at Culverden (on the Waiau Branch line) then transported in several trains to Addington.  In the last years of this traffic, there were in excess of 1,000 head to move, requiring a substantial portion of the cattle wagon fleet in the South Island.

When the workshops closed, it was decided to locate the new Christchurch railway station on the site for long distance trains (opened on 5 April 1993), see .

Today, the passenger facilities are gone, but the site still retains a signal box, several loops and railsheds for the storage of rolling stock.  The land formerly occupied by the saleyards is currently a vacant lot.

Belfast

Bryndwr
This station served passenger trains for residents of the suburbs of Bryndwr and Elmwood. Nothing of the station remains.

Burnham

Christchurch 

The current Christchurch station at Troup Drive is the third railway Christchurch station. The two earlier stations, at Madras Street and Moorhouse Avenue, were a short distance away to the east on the Main South Line, closer to the city centre.

Heathcote 
Originally known as The Valley, this station was sited about 240 meters from the mouth of the Lyttelton rail tunnel.  It was equipped with a signal box, freight sidings for nearby industrial customers as well as passenger facilities and a platform, which is the only remaining feature.  Public access is from Station Road, at the intersection with Flavell Street, Marsden Street and Rollin Street.

The signal box, constructed in 1870, was to have been moved to the Ferrymead Heritage Park for use in the rail operations there after many years of disuse until it was destroyed on-site by fire in September 1996, shortly before its relocation.

Hornby

Islington

Kaiapoi
The Main North Line railway runs through Kaiapoi, and the town once served as the junction for the Eyreton Branch, which provided rail access to communities west of Kaiapoi such as West Eyreton (though it ran to the north of Eyreton itself). This branch line opened in 1875 and closed fully by April 1965.

Kainga
The station at Kainga was a small rural station to serve the settlement of Kainga. Nothing of the station remains. The Main North Line through Kainga was opened on 1 September 1958 as a deviation when the Waimakariri River Bridge at Stewarts Gully was replaced with a new structure 1.6 km upstream.
<g

Ladbrooks

Lincoln

Linwood 
One of the "younger" stations on the line, Linwood was not built by the provincial council. Nothing remains of the station today, though it continued to serve in a rail capacity as the location of a locomotive depot until the depot was damaged beyond repair in the 2011 Christchurch earthquake and subsequently demolished, with the services it provided relocated to Middleton.

Little River 
The Little River station has been well preserved by the local community, who have converted into a centre that sells local craft and historical items. The platform and goods shed are still in good repair, and some metres of trackage have been installed so that a number of preserved freight wagons can be displayed.

Lyttelton 

Lyttelton railway station is the northern terminus of the Main South Line, a main trunk railway line from Lyttelton to Invercargill in the South Island of New Zealand. There have been three stations built at Lyttelton, with the most recent of these still being used for railway purposes.

Middleton

The Middleton Marshalling Yard in Christchurch on the Christchurch-Ashburton Line had a hump for shunting, and was opened on 5 December 1927. It closed in September 1930, then reopened in November 1946. Later it closed on 13 October 1986 for local loading and deliveries and fully closed on 22 October 1998.

Opawa 
This station served passenger trains for residents of the suburb of Opawa. Nothing of the station remains.

Papanui 

The Papanui Railway Station closed in 1991. It is located in Restell Street, Papanui, Christchurch, and is registered by the New Zealand Historic Places Trust as a Category II heritage building with registration number .

Rangiora

Riccarton 
The Riccarton railway station was located on the Main North Line, accessible from the south via Matai Street. The station building was to the west of the line.

Riccarton station was last serviced by a single weekday return service between Christchurch and Rangiora in 1976. These services were popular with commuters working in the eastern parts of the city, and also with railway staff based at the Addington Railway Workshops.

In 1959, there were still two daily return services. Riccarton station at the time had a small but busy freight yard, handling coal consignments for local merchants, timber from the West Coast, and wheat and flour traffic for the mill sited on land that now forms the grounds of Christchurch Girls' High School.

For many years, a special train ran through Riccarton station to the October meeting of the Kaikoura Trotting Club. It conveyed patrons, horses, trainers, sulkies and jockeys.  The popularity of this train diminished as horse floats were used to take horses and trainers to the meetings, and patrons opting to travel using private cars. The fact that the meetings were held midweek also limited the appeal.

In its heyday, in addition to the platform, station building and main line, the station also had a couple of loops and a curved siding from the north end of the yard that provided access to the flour mill. In late 1905, a spur line was built that left the Main North Line in this location heading through North Hagley Park to service the International Exhibition. The spur was used for freight traffic only and was removed in 1908.

Today, no obvious signs of the station remain. The yard is now a bus and car park, and a cycle/walk way runs along the western side of the line connecting Fendalton Road with Kereru Lane, which runs the length of the former yard.

Rolleston 
The small south Canterbury town of Rolleston was first served by a railway station built by the Canterbury Provincial Railways on their broad gauge line from Christchurch, which was then known as the Canterbury Great Southern Railway.  Since then, the station has been patronised by a variety of services, most recently by the long-distance TranzAlpine passenger train. 

The station is located on State Highway 1, at the intersection of Main South Road and Rolleston Drive. The current station building opened on March 17 1969

Sockburn

Stewarts Gully
This station served the settlement of Stewarts Gully on the south bank of the Waimakariri River, just south of Kaiapoi. The dates of operation of the station are not known at the time of writing, but the Main North Line in the area opened on 29 April 1872, and closed on 31 August 1958 when the Waimakariri River Bridge was replaced with a new structure and associated trackage 1.6 km upstream.

Templeton

Weedons

Woolston 

Formerly known as Hillsborough after another nearby suburb, this station continues to serve as a freight hub for several adjacent industrial customers. The platform and loading bank remain, though the station building has been demolished.

See also
 Rail transport in New Zealand
 Rail transport in Christchurch

Notes and references

Footnotes

Notes

References 

  
  
 
  
 
 Rail Heritage Trust of New Zealand

External links

Rail transport in Christchurch
Buildings and structures in Christchurch
Christchurch